The Vicious Kind is a 2009 drama film directed and written by Lee Toland Krieger. The screenplay was originally set in a small town in Rhode Island, but the film was shot in Norfolk, Connecticut, which also became the characters' hometown. The film stars Adam Scott, Brittany Snow, Alex Frost, and J.K. Simmons. The film premiered at the 2009 Sundance Film Festival, and opened in Los Angeles on December 11, 2009, at the Laemmle Sunset 5.

The Vicious Kind was nominated for two 2010 Independent Spirit Awards, Scott for Best Male Lead, and Krieger for Best Screenplay. In 2009, The Vicious Kind won several awards at film festivals around the world including Adam Scott for Best Actor at the Strasbourg International Film Festival, Scott for Best Performance at the Sidewalk Moving Picture Festival, Lee Toland Krieger for Emerging Filmmaker at the Denver Film Festival, and Best Feature at the New Orleans Film Festival.

Plot
Peter is an idealistic college student on Thanksgiving break, and his older brother Caleb is begrudgingly giving him a ride home. At school, Peter has found a new girlfriend, Emma Gainsborough, and Caleb immediately grills him for details. We find out that Emma and Peter met while Emma was dating another fraternity boy. Despite this, Peter says she's a "good girl" while Caleb immediately perceives her to be a "whore."

Caleb is immediately antagonistic to Emma, but they eventually arrive at the home of the boys' father, Donald. Caleb drops them off, but not before revealing to Emma that he and Donald do not get along and that this will be the last time he will see them this weekend.  Donald comes off as well-meaning, if somewhat crude and flirtatious.

Caleb has been having difficulty sleeping, and whenever he tries to sleep he keeps seeing images of his ex-girlfriend, Hannah, who behaves and looks strikingly similar to Emma. Hannah has been continuously calling Caleb without speaking, so he drops off pictures of himself having sex with a prostitute at her doorstep, ringing the bell and fleeing.

Caleb runs into Emma twice over the next two days, once at the bowling alley and again at the grocery store. He ends up physically and verbally attacking her, and threatens her not to hurt Peter, who is a good kid (and a virgin). Moments later, he breaks down, begging for her forgiveness.

That night, Emma sees Caleb trying to sneak around the yard with a camera. Emma wants an explanation about what happened earlier. Caleb goes into his belief on what he heard about her at school, his girlfriend Hannah who cheated on him, and his lack of sleep, which has further muddled his actions and behavior. Caleb eventually leaves, feeling better after these confessions.

The next morning, Emma asks Donald about Peter's mother, and he reveals that she died when Caleb and Peter were young. Donald also says that his wife cheated on him prior to being diagnosed with cancer and that no one visited her in her final months. At work, Caleb reveals he managed to fall asleep for a few minutes the night before.

Caleb, Peter and Emma go to a restaurant together. During a moment alone, Caleb assures Emma that he doesn't have feelings for her before forcibly kissing her. Emma says nothing about it to Peter. Caleb privately warns Peter to watch Emma carefully, because she's been eyeing him. Peter says he's in love with her and wants to give her his virginity, and Caleb laughs at the idea. Caleb apologizes for his ideas that she was a whore.

While Peter and Emma prepare to have intercourse, Peter reveals that what Donald told her is true, except that Caleb was the only one to see their mother before she died, and Caleb and Donald haven't spoken since. Caleb visits his prostitute, and asks her if it's normal to be in love with a perceived image of someone, even if that's not who they really are (likening Emma to Hannah). He then asks if she was abused as a child, which offends her. Caleb loses his temper, then comes back and gives her a better tip, implying that his perception and treatment of women is evolving.

Caleb tries apologizing to Emma for kissing her and says he'll try not to bother her anymore. Emma reveals she has accidentally locked herself out of the house, and Caleb manages to get them both inside through a window. Emma falls on top of Caleb, and they seem like they might be about to kiss before she rebukes him and asks him never to see her again. Caleb leaves, and Emma returns to the place they embraced to masturbate.

At a bar, Caleb's co-worker JT asks him if he's had sex with Emma yet, and he says no, but he wants to. He spots some men sexually harassing a woman and ends up fighting them, marking another change in him.

Peter tries to have sex with Emma but ejaculates prematurely. Caleb drives over to see Emma, and this time, she doesn't rebuke him when he kisses her, and eventually, they end up having passionate sex in Caleb's old room.

Emma asks why Caleb was the only one to see his mother before she died. He reveals he was hurt by her cheating, and shut her out of his life. However, he eventually discovered that Donald had been the one cheating until his wife finally left, never thinking that he would refuse to let her see her sons. Caleb never told Peter because he was only 12. Emma tells Caleb she was a virgin. Caleb leaves and reminds Emma that Peter is in love with her. On his way out, he runs into his father who deduces what happened and says he'll tell Peter. Caleb calls him a coward for erasing him out of his life. They both hide as Peter goes to Emma's room, and Caleb dictates to Donald that he won't tell Peter what he did, otherwise he'll tell him Donald's secrets and he'll lose both his sons. Peter and Emma sleep together, and he loses his virginity to her.

The next morning, Donald drives them to the train station. On the way, Peter tells Emma he loves her, but it causes Emma to cry. Donald confesses to Peter that he's made mistakes, and that sometimes, people know what they are doing is wrong but they do it anyway, because the right thing is painful. The two of them alone again, Caleb rings Donald's doorbell and Donald invites him in, their relationship beginning to mend at last.

Cast 
Adam Scott as Caleb Sinclaire
Brittany Snow as Emma
J.K. Simmons as Donald Sinclaire
Alex Frost as Peter Sinclaire
Alysia Reiner as Samantha 
Jordan Berkow as Hannah

References

External links 
 
 

2009 films
2009 comedy-drama films
Films about fraternities and sororities
Films about virginity
American comedy-drama films
Films directed by Lee Toland Krieger
Films about fratricide and sororicide
2009 comedy films
2009 drama films
2000s English-language films
2000s American films